District 63 is a district of the Texas House of Representatives that serves a portion of southern Denton County. The current representative for the district is Republican Ben Bumgarner, who was elected in 2022.

District description
The district is located entirely within Denton County, and represents part of the southern part of the county. Major cities in the district include most of Flower Mound, Lewisville, and Trophy Club. In addition, the district also represents portions of Carrollton and Roanoke.

Elections

Representatives

References

External links
District 63 information

063
Denton County, Texas